Darfur is a region of western Sudan, administratively divided into five federal states: Central Darfur, East Darfur, North Darfur, South Darfur and West Darfur.
It may also refer to:

 Sultanate of Darfur, historical state
 War in Darfur, a conflict in Darfur
 Darfur genocide, a systematic killing of ethnic Darfuri people as part of the conflict
 Darfur (film), a 2009 film directed by Uwe Boll
 Darfur, Minnesota, a city in the United States
 Darfür, Finnish hardcore punk band